The Beat of Wings in the Night (Swedish: Vingslag i natten) is a 1953 Swedish drama film directed by Kenne Fant and starring Edvin Adolphson, Erik Berglund and Naima Wifstrand. It was a major commercial success, along with One Summer of Happiness, boosting the fortunes of the production company Nordisk Tonefilm. The film's sets were designed by the art director Bibi Lindström.

Cast
 Edvin Adolphson as Tornelius, vicar
 Erik Berglund as Berno
 Naima Wifstrand as 	Ane
 Dagny Lind as Mrs. Tornelius
 Ruth Kasdan as 	Valborg
 Carl Ström as 	Kristen
 Nils Hallberg as Elmer Rönne
 Ulla-Bella Fridh as 	Hillevi
 Berit Gustafsson as 	Märta
 Renée Björling as 	Else Rönne
 Märta Dorff as 	Head Nurse
 Rut Kronström as	Teacher
 Kenne Fant as 	Ivar Tornelius
 Jan Olov Andersson as 	Gerald as child 
 Lars Ekborg as 	Gerald Rönne
 Pia Skoglund as 	Ninni Tornelius
 Kristina Adolphson as 	Ninni's friend 
 Bibi Andersson as 	Student at Tornelius' party 
 Magnus Kesster as Police constable 
 Sven Magnusson as 	Police constable 
 Olof Thunberg as 	Young man 
 Öllegård Wellton as 	Young man's girlfriend

References

Bibliography 
 Qvist, Per Olov & von Bagh, Peter. Guide to the Cinema of Sweden and Finland. Greenwood Publishing Group, 2000.
 Sundholm, John. Historical Dictionary of Scandinavian Cinema. Scarecrow Press, 2012.

External links 
 

1953 films
Swedish drama films
1953 drama films
1950s Swedish-language films
Films directed by Kenne Fant
Swedish black-and-white films
1950s Swedish films